The Diocese of Aachen is one of 27 dioceses in Germany and one of the six dioceses in the ecclesiastical province of Cologne. The incumbent bishop is Helmut Dieser, who was appointed by Pope Francis on 23 September 2016. The bishop's seat is Aachen.

Geography
The diocese is located in the very west of Germany, extending from Krefeld in the north to the mountainous Eifel area in the south. Bordering dioceses are Cologne, Münster, Essen and Trier in Germany, Liège in Belgium and Roermond in the Netherlands.

The diocese is divided into seven regions which are in turn further subdivided into 538 parishesː
 Region Aachen-Stadt (Aachen city)
 Region Düren
 Region Eifel
 Region Heinsberg
 Region Kempen Viersen
 Region Krefeld
 Region Mönchengladbach

Ordinaries
The bishop emeritus of Aachen is Heinrich Mussinghoff. There are two auxiliary bishops, Johannes Bündgens and Karl Borsch. Also, there are two emeritus auxiliary bishops, Gerd Dicke and Karl Reger. The vicar general is Andreas Frick.

List of diocesan bishops

List of auxiliary bishops

History
Historically, today's territory of the Diocese of Aachen belonged to the Diocese of Liège and the Archdiocese of Cologne. The diocese was first created in 1802, covering the area west of the Rhine formerly belonging to Cologne, as well as parts from the dioceses Liège, Utrecht, Roermond and Mainz. After the first bishop Marc Antoine Berdolet died in 1809, Pope Pius VII refused to commission the successor suggested by Napoleon, Jean Denis François Camus. After the French rulership over the area, the diocese was abolished by the bull De salute animarum of July 16, 1821, and incorporated into the archdiocese of Cologne.

On August 13, 1930 the diocese was re-established by the papal bull Pastorale officii nostri. Joseph Vogt was appointed as its first bishop.

Major Churches

The principal church of the diocese is the Aachen Cathedral, of which the central part, the Palatine Chapel, was built in 800 under Charlemagne. It was also the first German World Heritage Site, inscribed in 1978.

The diocese has two churches that have been given the status of basilica minorː
Steinfeld Basilica, Kall-Steinfeld – 7 October 1960
Minster St. Vitus, Mönchengladbach – 25 April 1973

See also
Catholic Church in Germany
List of Roman Catholic dioceses in Germany
Ursulakapelle, at Gressenich, part of Stolberg town

External links
Website of the Diocese
GCatholic.org
Website of the diocese

Roman Catholic dioceses in Germany
Religious organizations established in 1802
Religious organizations disestablished in 1821
Christian organizations established in 1930
1930 establishments in Germany
1802 establishments in the Holy Roman Empire